TPD can refer to:
 Theory of Positive Disintegration
 Temperature programmed desorption
 Therapeutic Products Directorate
 Tamper Proof Device
 Time propagation delay
 Titusville Police Department, Florida, US
 Tallahassee Police Department, Florida, US
 Total permanent disability insurance
 Tucson Police Department, Arizona, US
 Victoria Transit Patrol Department, Melbourne, Australia
 Tampa Police Department
 Telescopic pixel display
 Temporary Protection Directive in the European Union
 Tobacco Products Directive in the European Union

tpd can refer to:
 Ton per day, capacity specification for a pipeline